Pierre Eugène Jean Pflimlin (5 February 1907 – 27 June 2000) was a French Christian Democrat politician who served as the Prime Minister of the Fourth Republic for a few weeks in 1958, before being replaced by Charles de Gaulle during the crisis of that year.

Life
Pflimlin was born in Roubaix in the Nord department. A lawyer and a member of the Christian democratic Popular Republican Movement (MRP), he was elected deputy of département Bas Rhin in 1945. With his personal roots in Alsace, Pflimlin numbered among his MRP party colleagues the Luxembourg-born Robert Schuman; for both, relations with Germany played an important role in their political thinking.

He held some governmental offices during the Fourth Republic, notably as Minister of Agriculture (1947–1949 and 1950–1951) and as Minister of Economy and Finance (1955–1956, 1957–1958).

Prime Minister of France
On 13 May 1958, the French National Assembly approved his nomination as Prime Minister. But the same day, riots took place in Algiers. The French generals in Algeria feared he would arrange for a negotiated solution with the Algerian nationalists giving them control of Algeria. They refused to recognize his cabinet. At this point the leading politicians deserted him, including Guy Mollet, Vincent Auriol, and Antoine Pinay. The crisis culminated in a coup d'état in Algier that was resolved with his resignation, thus facilitating Charles de Gaulle accession to the post of Prime Minister on 1 June.

Subsequent public offices
Pflimlin was Minister of State until 1959. As Minister of Cooperation in 1962, he resigned with the other MRP ministers in order to protest against the euro-scepticism of de Gaulle.

Pflimlin served as the first Catholic mayor of Strasbourg from 1959 to 1983.

He also was the President of the Parliamentary Assembly of the Council of Europe from 1963 to 1966 and President of the European Parliament from 1984 to 1987.

Honors
The Pierre Pflimlin bridge over the Rhine south of Strasbourg, connecting France to Germany, is named after him and was opened in 2002.

Government (14 May – 1 June 1958)
Pierre Pflimlin – President of the Council
Guy Mollet – Vice President of the Council
René Pleven – Minister of Foreign Affairs
Maurice Faure – Minister of the Interior
Pierre de Chevigné – Minister of Armed Forces
Edgar Faure – Minister of Finance, Economic Affairs, and Planning
Paul Ribeyre – Minister of Commerce and Industry
Paul Bacon – Minister of Labour and Social Security
Robert Lecourt – Minister of Justice
Jacques Bordeneuve – Minister of National Education
Vincent Badie – Minister of Veterans and War Victims
Roland Boscary-Monsservin – Minister of Agriculture
André Colin – Minister of Overseas France
Édouard Bonnefous – Minister of Public Works, Transport, and Tourism
André Maroselli – Minister of Public Health and Population
Pierre Garet – Minister of Reconstruction and Housing
Édouard Corniglion-Molinier – Minister for the Sahara
Félix Houphouët-Boigny – Minister of State

Changes:
17 May 1958 – Maurice Faure becomes Minister of European Institutions. Jules Moch succeeds Faure as Minister of the Interior. Albert Gazier enters the ministry as Minister of Information. Max Lejeune succeeds Houphouët-Boigny as Minister of State.

References

Further reading
  
 
 Morris, Peter. "Homo politicus; the political careers of Pierre Pflimlin and Jacques Chaban‐Delmas." Modern & Contemporary France 1.1 (1993): 42–44.

1907 births
2000 deaths
People from Roubaix
French Roman Catholics
French people of German descent
Politicians from Hauts-de-France
Popular Republican Movement politicians
Democratic Centre (France) politicians
Centre of Social Democrats politicians
Union for French Democracy politicians
Prime Ministers of France
French Ministers of Commerce and Industry
French Ministers of Overseas France
French Ministers of Finance
French Ministers of Agriculture
Members of the Constituent Assembly of France (1945)
Members of the Constituent Assembly of France (1946)
Deputies of the 1st National Assembly of the French Fourth Republic
Deputies of the 2nd National Assembly of the French Fourth Republic
Deputies of the 3rd National Assembly of the French Fourth Republic
Deputies of the 1st National Assembly of the French Fifth Republic
Deputies of the 2nd National Assembly of the French Fifth Republic
Mayors of Strasbourg
Presidents of the European Parliament
Popular Republican Movement MEPs
MEPs for France 1984–1989
Parliamentary Assembly of the Council of Europe
French military personnel of World War II
French people of the Algerian War
Commanders Crosses of the Order of Merit of the Federal Republic of Germany
Recipients of the Order of Merit of Baden-Württemberg